Sandbach United Football Club is an English football club based in Sandbach, Cheshire. The club is a FA Charter Standard Club affiliated to the Cheshire Football Association.

History
The club was formed in 2004 following the merger of Sandbach Albion and Sandbach Ramblers. They initially competed in the Staffordshire County League, but in 2011 they joined the Cheshire League. They were promoted to the competition's top flight in 2014, and in 2016 they were admitted to the North West Counties Football League Division One, at level 10 of the English football league system.

In the first season in the North West Counties Football League they finished in 6th position, missing out on promotion, and they reached the final of the Reusch First Division Challenge Cup.

In 2017–18 they entered the FA Vase for the first time, but were beaten 2–0 at home by AFC Emley. Also in 2017/18 they beat Tranmere Rovers 2–1 in the Cheshire Senior Cup preliminary round.

The 2018–19 season provided the club with its first trophy since joining The North West Counties Football League as they defeated Avro FC 4–2 to lift The First Division Challenge Cup. The club also made their debut in the FA Cup, joining the competition in the extra preliminary round, but got knocked out by Parkgate in this round.

The 2019–20 season was very different indeed, Sandbach United were unable to replicate the high league position for most of the season and struggled with many player changes which disrupted the team. However they did continue to impress in the challenge cup as holders it gave the team hope of some success. The season was curtailed and declared null and void due to COVID-19, this ironically was to be a blessing a it gave the team chance to regroup and when the league decided to play out the remaining rounds of the cup in September 2020 Sandbach took the chance and went on to retain the cup in an exciting game against AFC Liverpool. The game finished 2–2 with Sandbach coming from behind twice, the cup was ultimately decided on penalties with Sandbach the victors with a 4–3 shootout score. A further piece of luck sees Sandbach get another shot at promotion after the null and void season meant it was four to be promoted again in the 2020–21 season.

The 2020–21 season started well with Sandbach maintaining a play off position throughout the season until once again the season was brought to an end through the pandemic. Sandbach, confident of promotion, sat in the top four and were dismayed when the FA decided that promotion would be based on average PPG over the last two seasons. This resulted in Sandbach dropping out of the top four sides being replaced by Stone Old Aalenian who found themselves promoted and laterally moved. Ironically, missing out on promotion probably saved Sandbach from a lateral move to the Midland league.

The 2021–22 season started well with Sandbach holding the top spot by the end of the August, however through September the team slid down the league with a number of draws falling to 7th place by December. A positive for the season was an extended FA Vase run which saw Sandbach reach the 3rd round proper for the first time in the clubs history beating one of the favourites along the way (Hanley Town) until finally succumbing to Loughborough Students. In January 2022, it was announced by the club that first team manager Andy Hockenhull would step down from his role after 9 years in charge. The club swiftly appointed Declan Swan as caretaker manager whilst the club searched for a permanent manager for the 2022–23 season with the caretaker manager making an instant impact with a euphoric 5–3 victory away in the league to FC IOM. Sandbach being the only team in the season that has secured a victory at the Bowl in the league. After a rigorous interview process with a large number of applicants Declan Swan was appointed as the full time manager for the 2022–23 season.

Ground

The club play their home games at the Sandbach Community Football Centre. The ground is equipped with six floodlights. On promotion to the league a 50-seat covered prefabricated seated stand was erected in memory of Colin Oakes the former club president. A standing are was also erected.  with two small covered standing areas nicknamed the "Shed End", the club has an indoor and outside licensed bar area with hospitality suite known as "The Crossbar". in 2020 an electronic scoreboard was added to the ground, the dugouts replaced and moved to the opposite side of the pitch to facilitate the placement of the second 50-seater stand (The Andrew Kimber Stand) which is due to be opened for the 2022/23 season.

Honours

NWCFL First Division Challenge Cup
 Runners Up: 2016–17
 Winners: 2018–19
 Winners: 2019–20
Crewe and District Cup
 Winners (1) 2015–16

League Position

Non-playing staff

Players

Current squad

Notable former club players/members 
  Tommy Doyle
  Cohen Bramall 
  Steve Jones
  Josh Lundstram
  Paul Taylor

Kit

References

External links
Official website

Football clubs in England
Association football clubs established in 2004
2004 establishments in England
Football clubs in Cheshire
Cheshire Association Football League
North West Counties Football League clubs